Josephine Frigge (born 3 October 1993) is a Swedish football goalkeeper of Dutch descent who plays for IF Brommapojkarna of the Elitettan.

Club career

Frigge played at Borgeby FK in her youth years and played in the United States at Lindsey Wilson College Blue Raiders in 2012. At Lindsey Wilson College she won the 2012 NAIA Championship. But made the switch to the 2nd Swedish level in 2013 when joining IF Limhamn Bunkeflo. On 29 July 2015 in a match against IFK Kalmar Frigge broke her leg to be out until the end of the 2015 season.

Josephine Frigge made here debut in the Swedish Damallsvenskan against FC Rosengård in 2017 in the derby with 7825 attendance in Malmö New Stadium.

In 2017 her contract with Limhamn Bunkeflo expired and in February 2018 she joined the ten-time Swedish champions FC Rosengård.

References

External links
 

1993 births
Living people
Swedish women's footballers
Women's association football goalkeepers
IF Limhamn Bunkeflo players
Lindsey Wilson Blue Raiders women's soccer players
Damallsvenskan players
IF Brommapojkarna (women) players
Elitettan players